Through the Barricades is the fifth studio album by English new wave band Spandau Ballet, released on 17 November 1986 by CBS Records in the United Kingdom and by Epic Records in the United States. The album reached number seven and remained on the UK Albums Chart for 19 weeks. It spawned three UK commercially successful singles: "Fight for Ourselves" ( 15), "How Many Lies" (No. 34) and the band's final top-10 entry, "Through the Barricades" (No. 6).

The lyrics to the title track were inspired by love prevailing over the Troubles in Northern Ireland and the murder of a member of the crew in the Troubles, by a British soldier.

Reception
In a mainly critical retrospective review for AllMusic, Dan LeRoy claimed: "Rocking up Spandau Ballet's smooth white-boy soul, Through the Barricades manages to avoid utter disaster via the tuneful creations of songwriter/guitarist Gary Kemp." LeRoy argued "the production and mix prove the undoing of this effort. Most of the tunes demand guitar and drum bombast; instead, the riff-rocking Cross the Line and Fight for Ourselves, in particular, are undercut by the polite-sounding rhythm section." However, he praised the title-track, which he said "became a deserved hit."

Track listing

Personnel

Spandau Ballet
 Tony Hadley – lead and backing vocals
 Gary Kemp – guitars
 Martin Kemp – bass
 John Keeble – drums
 Steve Norman – percussion, saxophones

Additional musicians
 Toby Chapman – keyboards, synthesizers
 Ruby James – backing vocals
 Shirley Lewis – backing vocals
 Helena Springs – backing vocals

Technical
 Spandau Ballet – production
 Gary Langon – production, engineering
 Stephen Wissnet – engineering assistance
 Andy Pearson – drum technician
 Catherine Bell – project coordination
 Jackie Vickers – project coordination
 Zoe Vickers – project coordination
 Gary Movat – design
 Assorted Images – design
 Nick Knight – sleeve photography

Charts

Weekly charts

Year-end charts

Certifications

References

1986 albums
CBS Records albums
Epic Records albums
Spandau Ballet albums